People's Press is a Denmark-based publishing house headquartered in Copenhagen. In March 2017, Swedish e-book company Storytel acquired 100% of shares in the publishing house at the cost of $10.72 million on debt-free basis.

Founded in 2002, People's Press publishes about 100 books annually and has a backlist of over 1,200 titles. Prior to Storytel's acquisition, the publisher has been part of People Group.

References

2002 establishments in Denmark
Organizations based in Copenhagen
Publishing organizations
Publishing companies of Sweden
Publishing companies of Denmark